The 2020 United States House of Representatives elections in South Carolina was held on November 3, 2020, to elect the seven U.S. representatives from the state of South Carolina, one from each of the state's seven congressional districts. The elections coincided with the 2020 U.S. presidential election, as well as other elections to the House of Representatives, elections to the United States Senate and various state and local elections.

Overview
{|class="wikitable plainrowheaders sortable" style="font-size:100%; text-align:right;"
! scope=col rowspan=3|District
! scope=col colspan=2|Republican
! scope=col colspan=2|Democratic
! scope=col colspan=2|Others
! scope=col colspan=2|Total
! scope=col rowspan=3|Result
|-
! scope=col colspan=2 style="background:"|  !! scope=col colspan=2 style="background:"| !! scope=col colspan=2| !! scope=col colspan=2|
|-
! scope=col data-sort-type="number"|Votes !! scope=col data-sort-type="number"|% !! scope=col data-sort-type="number"|Votes !! scope=col data-sort-type="number"|% !! scope=col data-sort-type="number"|Votes !! scope=col data-sort-type="number"|% !! scope=col data-sort-type="number"|Votes !! scope=col data-sort-type="number"|%
|- 
| align=left| || 216,042 || 50.58% || 210,627 || 49.31% || 442 || 0.10% || 427,111 || 100.0% || align=left|Republican gain
|- 
| align=left| || 202,715 || 55.66% || 155,118 || 42.59% || 6,382 || 1.75% || 364,215 || 100.0% || align=left|Republican hold
|- 
| align=left| || 237,544 || 71.21% || 95,712 || 28.69% || 308 || 0.09% || 333,564 || 100.0% || align=left|Republican hold
|- 
| align=left| || 222,126 || 61.61% || 133,023 || 36.89% || 5,401 || 1.50% || 360,550 || 100.0% || align=left|Republican hold
|- 
| align=left| || 220,006 || 60.07% || 145,979 || 39.86% || 273 || 0.07% || 366,258 || 100.0% || align=left|Republican hold
|- 
| align=left| || 89,258 || 30.81% || 197,477 || 68.18% || 2,918 || 1.01% || 289,653 || 100.0% || align=left|Democratic hold
|- 
| align=left| || 224,993 || 61.80% || 138,863 || 38.14% || 235 || 0.06% || 364,091 || 100.0% || align=left|Republican hold
|- class="sortbottom" style="font-weight:bold"
| align=left|Total || 1,412,684 || 56.38% || 1,076,799 || 42.98% || 15,959 || 0.64% || 2,505,442 || 100.0% || 
|}

District 1

The 1st district straddles the Atlantic coast of the state, and includes most of Charleston. The incumbent was Democrat Joe Cunningham, who flipped the district and was first elected with 50.6% of the vote in 2018.

Democratic primary
Candidates
Nominee
Joe Cunningham, incumbent U.S. representative

Republican primary
Candidates
Nominee
Nancy Mace, state representative and candidate for U.S. Senate in 2014

Eliminated in primary
Chris Cox, founder of Bikers for Trump
Kathy Landing, Mount Pleasant councilwoman
Brad Mole, Bluffton housing official

Withdrawn
Mike Covert, Beaufort County councilman
Logan Cunningham, teacher

Declined
Katie Arrington, former state representative and nominee for this district in 2018
Chip Campsen, state senator
Tom Davis, state senator
Larry Grooms, state senator
Larry Kobrovsky, chair of the Charleston County Republican Party
Sam McCown, doctor
Peter McCoy, state representative and candidate for this district in 2013
Weston J. Newton, state representative
Samuel Rivers Jr., former state representative
Mark Sanford, former U.S. representative, former governor of South Carolina, and candidate for president in 2020
Mike Seekings, Charleston city councilman
Elliott Summey, Charleston County councilman
Catherine Templeton, attorney and candidate for governor in 2018
Teddy Turner, teacher, entrepreneur, and candidate for this district in 2013

Endorsements

Polling

Primary results

General election
Predictions

Debate

 Complete video of debate

Endorsements

Fundraising

Polling

with Joe Cunningham and Kathy Landing

with Generic Democrat and Generic Republican

Results

District 2

The 2nd district is located in central South Carolina and spans from Columbia to the South Carolina side of the Augusta, Georgia metropolitan area, including North Augusta. The incumbent was Republican Joe Wilson, who was re-elected with 56.3% of the vote in 2018.

Republican primary
Candidates
Nominee
Joe Wilson, incumbent U.S. representative

Eliminated in primary
Michael Bishop

Primary results

Democratic primary
Candidates
Nominee
Adair Boroughs, attorney

Withdrawn
Lawrence Nathaniel, activist

Declined
Brenda K. Sanders, former judge for Michigan's 36th District Court

General election
Predictions

Debate

 Complete video of debate

Endorsements

Fundraising

ResultsCounties that flipped from Democratic to Republican Orangeburg (largest municipality: Orangeburg)

District 3

The 3rd district takes in the Piedmont area in northwestern South Carolina, including Anderson and Greenwood. The incumbent was Republican Jeff Duncan, who was re-elected with 67.8% of the vote in 2018.

Republican primary
Candidates
Nominee
Jeff Duncan, incumbent U.S. representative

Democratic primary
Candidates
Nominee
Hosea Cleveland, veteran and candidate for this district in 2014 and 2016

Eliminated in primary
Mark Welch

Primary results

General election
Predictions

Fundraising

Results

District 4

The 4th district is located in Upstate South Carolina, taking in Greenville and Spartanburg. The incumbent was Republican William Timmons, who was first elected with 59.6% of the vote in 2018.

Republican primary
Candidates
Nominee
William Timmons, incumbent U.S. representative

Democratic primary
Candidates
Nominee
Kim Nelson, public health advocate

General election
Predictions

Fundraising

Results

District 5

The 5th district is located in northern South Carolina and encompasses the southern suburbs and exurbs of Charlotte, including Rock Hill. The incumbent was Republican Ralph Norman, who was re-elected with 57.0% of the vote in 2018.

Republican primary
Candidates
Nominee
Ralph Norman, incumbent U.S. representative

Democratic primary
Candidates
Nominee
Moe Brown, former University of South Carolina football player

Eliminated in primary
Sidney A. Moore, former York County councilmember

Primary results

General election
Predictions

Fundraising

Results

District 6

The 6th district runs through the Black Belt and takes in Columbia and North Charleston. The incumbent was Democrat Jim Clyburn, who was re-elected with 70.1% of the vote in 2018.

Democratic primary
Candidates
Nominee
Jim Clyburn, incumbent U.S. representative

Republican primary
Candidates
Nominee
John McCollum, veteran

General election
Predictions

Fundraising

ResultsCounties that flipped from Democratic to Republican'''
 Calhoun (largest municipality: St. Matthews)
 Colleton (largest municipality: Walterboro)
 Dorchester (largest municipality: North Charleston)

District 7

The 7th district is located in northeastern South Carolina, taking in Myrtle Beach and Florence. The incumbent is Republican Tom Rice, who was re-elected with 59.6% of the vote in 2018.

Republican primary

Candidates

Nominee
Tom Rice, incumbent U.S. Representative

Democratic primary

Candidates

Nominee
Melissa Ward Watson, nonprofit executive

Eliminated in primary
Robert Williams, state representative and nominee for South Carolina's 7th congressional district in 2018
William H. Williams

Primary results

General election

Predictions

Results

See also
 2020 South Carolina elections

Notes 

Partisan clients

Footnotes

References

External links
 
 
  (State affiliate of the U.S. League of Women Voters)
 

Official campaign websites for 1st district candidates
 Joe Cunningham (D) for Congress 
 Nancy Mace (R) for Congress 

Official campaign websites for 2nd district candidates
 Adair Boroughs (D) for Congress 
 Sonny Narang (A) for Congress 
 Joe Wilson (R) for Congress 

Official campaign websites for 3rd district candidates
 Hosea Cleveland (D) for Congress 
 Jeff Duncan (R) for Congress 

Official campaign websites for 4th district candidates
 Kim Nelson (D) for Congress 
 William Timmons (R) for Congress 

Official campaign websites for 5th district candidates
 Moe Brown (D) for Congress 
 Ralph Norman (R) for Congress 

Official campaign websites for 6th district candidates
 Jim Clyburn (D) for Congress 
 John McCollum (R) for Congress 

Official campaign websites for 7th district candidates
 Tom Rice (R) for Congress 
 Melissa Ward Watson (D) for Congress 

2020
South Carolina
United States House of Representatives